The Men Who Stare at Goats is a 2009 satirical black comedy war film directed by Grant Heslov, adapted by Peter Straughan, and starring George Clooney, Ewan McGregor, Jeff Bridges, and Kevin Spacey. It was produced by Clooney's and Heslov's production company Smokehouse Pictures. The film is a fictionalized version of Jon Ronson's 2004 book of the same title of an investigation into attempts by the U.S. military to employ psychic powers as a weapon — which, in turn, is a companion to a British miniseries Crazy Rulers of the World.

The film premiered at the 66th Venice International Film Festival on September 8, 2009, and went on general release in the United States and the United Kingdom on November 6, 2009. The film received mixed reviews from critics.

Plot

In a short prelude, U.S. Army General Dean Hopgood is painfully thwarted in an attempt to pass paranormally through a solid wall by simply running into it.

Ann Arbor Daily Telegram reporter Bob Wilton's wife leaves him for the editor. To prove himself, Bob flies to Kuwait to report on the Iraq War. He stumbles onto the story of a lifetime when he meets retired U.S. Army Special Forces operator Lyn Cassady, who reveals he was part of a unit training psychic spies to develop parapsychological skills including invisibility, remote viewing, and phasing.

In 1972, Army officer Bill Django, after falling out of a helicopter in Vietnam, found his newly recruited men unable or unwilling to fire on a Viet Cong soldier before being shot in the chest. He then underwent a fact-finding mission prompted by a vision of a female Viet Cong soldier who says "their gentleness is their strength." Django's mission immersed him in the New Age movement so that, when he returned to Fort Bragg, North Carolina, in 1980, he had long braided hair and a tattoo of an All-seeing Eye surmounting a pyramid on his chest.

Facilitated by the credulous General Hopgood, Django led the training of a New Earth Army, with Lyn Cassady and Larry Hooper as his top students. The two developed a rivalry over their opposing views on implementing the New Earth Army's philosophy. Lyn wanted to emphasize the teachings' positive side, such as resolving conflict peacefully, whereas Larry was interested in the "dark side" of its military application.

Lyn takes Bob into Iraq. Kidnapped by criminals who want to sell them to insurgents, they escape with fellow hostage Mahmud Daash and are rescued by a private security detail led by Todd Nixon. Fleeing when the detail is caught in a firefight fiasco with another American security detail, Bob and Lyn continue on Lyn's mission prompted by Lyn's vision of Bill Django.

After their car is disabled by an IED Bob and Lyn wander in the desert. Lyn reveals that he had stopped a goat's heart to test the limit of his mental abilities, and believes this evil deed has cursed him and the New Earth Army. It's also revealed that Hooper conducted an unauthorized LSD experiment in which a soldier killed himself, forcing Django out of the Army.

Bob and Lyn are rescued at a camp run by PSIC, a private research firm engaged in psychic and psychological experiments on a herd of goats and some captured locals. To Lyn's dismay, Larry runs the firm and employs Django, now a depressed alcoholic. Bob learns the ways of the New Earth Army and they spike the base's food and water with LSD and free the goats and captured locals, in an attempt to remove the curse. Lyn and Django fly off in a helicopter, disappearing into the sky "like all shamans".

Bob returns to work as a reporter and writes an article about his experience with Lyn. He is frustrated that the story's only portion to be aired is how the captives were forced to listen to the Barney & Friends theme song for 24 hours, which dilutes his story to the level of a joke. Bob vows to continue trying to get the bigger story out. He exercises his own psychic abilities and, following some intense concentration, seemingly runs through a solid wall in his office.

Cast

 George Clooney as Lyn Cassady, a combination of several real-life psychic spies. Elements of his character are primarily based on Glenn Wheaton and his name resembles that of Lyn Buchanan. His background details match those of Guy Savelli, the man who claims to have killed a goat by staring it down and now runs a dance studio as Lyn does in the film. Also, some of Lyn's actions in the film mimic Peter Brusso's interactions with Ronson, particularly the "Predator" scene, and the "attack me" scene.
 Ewan McGregor as Bob Wilton, apparently inspired by Ronson, a mild-mannered investigative journalist who uncovers the bizarre truth.
 Jeff Bridges as Bill Django, based on Lt. Col. Jim Channon who spent two years in the 1970s investigating new age movements, and subsequently wrote an operations manual for a First Earth Battalion. Also says "like a boy in a desert planet" (a reference to Luke Skywalker) and an "albatross around his neck" a reference to "The Rime of the Ancient Mariner" by the English poet Samuel Taylor Coleridge, written in 1797–98 and published in 1798.
 Kevin Spacey as Larry Hooper. An apparent original creation for the film, Larry represents the New Earth Army's dark side and wishes to use the non-lethal technologies in harmful ways and is the film's main antagonist.
 Robert Patrick as Todd Nixon, an original character heading up a private security firm in post-invasion Iraq.
 Stephen Lang as Major General Dean Hopgood, who is based on Major General Albert Stubblebine III, and firmly believes people can walk through walls.
 Stephen Root as Gus Lacey, who introduces Bob to the New Earth Army's concepts; also somewhat based on Guy Savelli and Lyn Buchanan.
 Glenn Morshower as Major Jim Holtz, a more by-the-book soldier.
 Waleed Zuaiter as Mahmud Dash, an Iraqi who gets captured with Cassady and Wilton.
 Nick Offerman as Scotty Mercer
 Rebecca Mader as Debora Wilton

The film's end titles expand on the characters' factual links with this proviso:

Reception

Critical response
On review website Rotten Tomatoes, the film holds an approval rating of 51% based on 217 reviews, with an average rating of 5.8/10. The website's critical consensus reads: "Though The Men Who Stare at Goats is a mostly entertaining, farcical glimpse of men at war, some may find its satire and dark humor less than edgy." Metacritic assigned the film a weighted average score of 54 out of 100, based on 33 critics, indicating "mixed or average reviews". Audiences polled by CinemaScore gave the film an average grade of "C+" on an A+ to F scale.

George Clooney's performance was very positively received. Mike Sheridan of entertainment.ie wrote, "Clooney shines in this remarkable story, based on actual events...Clooney is now pretty much the sole bearer of the 'classic movie star' tag, and once again, he injects a performance with a Coen brothers level of quirky. His twitches, his more ponderous moments; you buy this character because it's Clooney, and he's exceptional here."

John Sergeant complaint
The film is inspired by British journalist Jon Ronson's book, which was accompanied by the 2004 Channel 4 three-part documentary Crazy Rulers of the World. In turn, Ronson had dedicated his book to journalist and filmmaker John Sergeant, who worked intensely through 2003 and 2004 on the documentary. However, Sergeant has complained he has not received any credit for his part in formulating what was the inspiration for the film. Sergeant's version of events is corroborated by a number of sources: the book The Men Who Stare at Goats itself is dedicated to Sergeant, and the afterword states: "John's research and guidance can be found on every page". Further, Colonel John B. Alexander – one of the story's leaders – has written to Sergeant: "If you want support for your position, tell reporters (or lawyers) to contact me. You were definitely the key person in developing the whole Goats project."

Release

Home media
The Men Who Stare at Goats was released on DVD and Blu-ray Disc in Region 1 on March 23, 2010, and was released in Region 2 on April 19, 2010. The extras include "Goats Declassified: The Real Men of the First Earth Battalion".

References

External links

 
 
 
 
 

2009 films
2009 black comedy films
American black comedy films
Arabic-language films
British black comedy films
Films about journalists
Films based on non-fiction books
Films shot in New Mexico
Films shot in Puerto Rico
Films set in the 1970s
Films set in the 1980s
Films set in the 1990s
Films set in the 2000s
Iraq War films
Overture Films films
Paranormal films
Films about the United States Army's psychological operations units
BBC Film films
Smokehouse Pictures films
Films produced by Grant Heslov
Films produced by George Clooney
Films directed by Grant Heslov
Films scored by Rolfe Kent
2009 comedy films
Films set in Kuwait
Films set in Michigan
Films set in North Carolina
2000s English-language films
2000s American films
2000s British films